I'm Still Livin' is the tenth solo studio album by American rapper Z-Ro from Houston, Texas. It was released on November 7, 2006 via Rap-A-Lot Records, Atlantic Records and Asylum Records. Production was primarily handled by Mike Dean, alongside Richard "Enigma" Hervey, Bigg Tyme, Dani Kartel, Mr. Lee, and Z-Ro himself. It features guest appearances from P.O.P., Tanya Herron, Trae tha Truth, Big Hawk, Bun B and Lil' Keke. The album peaked at number 75 on the Billboard 200 in the United States. Its chopped and screwed version was edited by Paul Wall.

Track listing

Charts

References

External links

2006 albums
Z-Ro albums
Rap-A-Lot Records albums
Albums produced by Mike Dean (record producer)